The Radiance class is a class of four cruise ships operated by Royal Caribbean built between 2001 and 2004 at Meyer Werft shipyard in Papenburg, Germany.

Radiance-class ships have a gross tonnage of 90,090, being smaller than the preceding Voyager class. The Radiance class is built to Panamax form factor, allowing them to pass through the Panama Canal. The power plant on all ships consists of environmentally friendlier but less fuel efficient gas turbines.

During their refurbishment, the ships of this class have been refitted to incorporate the "Centrum Wow" events, which transformed the multi-level atrium into vertical theater for aerialists (aerial gymnasts).

Ships

Similar ships
  - a similar class of Panamax ships operated by Carnival Cruise Lines and Costa Cruises.
  - a similar Panamax ship operated by P&O Cruises.
  - a similar Panamax sized ship operated by Cunard Line.
  - a similar class of Panamax ships operated by Holland America Line
 Signature-class cruise ship - a similar class of Panamax ships operated by Holland America Line
  and  - A similar set of Panamax ships operated by Princess Cruises
  and  - A set of Panamax ships operated by Costa Cruises derived from the Spirit and Vista-class designs.

References

Cruise ship classes
Royal Caribbean International
Panamax cruise ships